Orogen is a solo piano album by American pianist John Burke. The album was inspired by the tectonic creation of mountains and utilizes melodic development to illustrate this creation. A self-released title, Orogen earned Burke a Grammy Award nomination for Best New Age Album.

Track listing

References

2016 albums
New-age albums by American artists